Bed is a 2012 South Korean erotic romance film directed by Park Chul-soo, based on the short story of the same name by novelist Kwon Ji-ye. Starring theater actors Jang Hyuk-jin, Lee Min-a and Kim Na-mi, the film is an erotic relationship drama about three people. B, whose life "begins on the bed and ends on the bed", has an affair with married woman E and later, after she breaks up with him, he marries D, a single mother and career woman. The film features frequent full-frontal nudity.

B-E-D made its world premiere at the 17th Busan International Film Festival in 2012, and was released in theaters on March 12, 2015.

Plot
E is everything to B. B is desperate because he knows he can't get enough of E. E wants to be liberated from her everyday boredom. She needs change. However, she doesn't want to cross the borders of her own life. D needs a comfortable family. D tries to be realistic and rational. The stories of three characters whose joy, passion and despair overflow in one bed are tangled like a puzzle, and a fearless and unhesitating exploration of human desires.

Cast
Jang Hyuk-jin as B
Lee Min-a as E
Kim Na-mi as D
Noh Yoon-ah
Lee Seong-wook
Bae Jang-soo

See also
 Nudity in film (East Asian cinema since 1929)

References

External links
 
 
 

2012 films
2010s erotic films
2012 independent films
South Korean erotic romance films
South Korean independent films
Erotic short films
2010s South Korean films